David Pitt-Watson is a Scottish business and social entrepreneur and author. He is a Fellow at Cambridge Judge Business School, and has been active in various initiatives to promote responsible investment including co-chairing the United Nations Environment Programme Finance Initiative, and leading the Royal Society of Arts Tomorrow's Investor Project. He is an independent non-executive at KPMG and an advisor to Aviva Investors, Sarasin & Partners LLP and Ownership Capital.

Personal life

Early life
Born in 1956 in Aberdeen, Scotland, he is the son of Ian Pitt-Watson and Helen Pitt-Watson. He has two sisters, Margaret and Rosemary. His grandfather was James Pitt-Watson, Moderator of the General Assembly of the Church of Scotland 1953/4.

Education 
Pitt-Watson was educated at Bearsden Academy and Aberdeen Grammar School and then at Queen's College, Oxford where he studied Politics, Philosophy and Economics. He went on to win a scholarship from the Rotary Foundation to Stanford University Graduate School of Business, where he graduated with an MA and MBA in 1980.

Career
After short periods of work at 3i and McKinsey Pitt-Watson helped establish and was ultimately managing director of Braxton Associates Limited. He worked there for 17 years during which time it was bought by Deloitte and became Deloitte Consulting. Pitt-Watson was a partner at Deloitte for 12 years advising company boards and international agencies on strategy and competitiveness.

He left that position in 1997 to become Assistant General Secretary of the Labour Party, a post he held for two years before joining Hermes Fund Managers as commercial director of their newly formed shareholder activist funds.

These funds, known as the Focus Funds, grew to be the largest of their kind in Europe. Pitt-Watson became head of the funds and a director of Hermes in 2004, where he founded Hermes Equity Ownership Service, a service to pension funds which aims to ensure that shares they own are used to promote good management practice and sustainable investment. By 2018 HEOS advised on over £400bn worth of assets. Hermes interventions in companies have led to the successful turnaround of some of the country's largest companies.

For over twenty years he has advised policy makers of all parties, including Tony Blair and Gordon Brown, on issues of industrial and financial policy, corporate governance and financial market regulation. He has also advised the current government and was a member of the cross-party Future of Banking Commission, chaired by David Davis, and the Sharman Commission relating to the use of the Going Concern rules.

Author

Pitt-Watson co-authored What They Do With Your Money with Stephen Davis and Jon Lukomnik, published by Yale University Press in 2016. It describes how the financial system, whose services are essential to the economy, has become dysfunctional, and how this problem can be addressed.

With Davis and Lukomnik, he also wrote The New Capitalists, which describes how structures of corporate governance can help ensure companies work in the interest of the millions of individuals who own their shares. It was published in November 2006 by Harvard Business School Press and translated into five languages. He also co-authored with Carol Scott Leonard, Privatisation and Transition in Russia in the early 1990s, based on his experience as a strategic adviser to the World Bank.

Pitt-Watson is the author of The Hermes Principles, which lays out the expectations of Hermes of the companies in which it invests, and forms the rationale for Hermes interventions in under performing companies.

Together with these publications, Pitt-Watson has written numerous papers and articles, and has been a regular contributor to British newspapers.

Charity work and public service
Pitt-Watson chaired the UN Environment Programme's Finance Initiative, a unique partnership between the UN and over 200 financial institutions in the run up to the 2015 United Nations Climate Change Committee. Its aim is to identify, promote and realise best sustainability practices within the finance industry. He was a trustee and treasurer of Oxfam GB from 2011– 2017, where he had been closely involved in helping to establish its Enterprise Development Programme. Pitt-Watson was a trustee of Nesta, the innovation charity where he chaired its £400million endowment. He is a trustee of the Institute for Public Policy Research and was founding chair of the Speakers' Corner Trust.

At the Royal Society for the Encouragement of Arts, Manufactures & Commerce (The RSA) he established the Tomorrow's Investor programme. It has been influential in raising the debate and achieving a consensus for reform to improve the structures, costs and transparency of pensions in Britain.

In February 2000 he helped initiate and served on the Co-operative Commission which aimed to help revive the fortunes of the UK Co-operative movement.

Pitt-Watson was also a councillor on Westminster City Council, for the Maida Vale ward, from 1986 to 1990.

Academic appointment
In addition to his Fellowship at Cambridge, Pitt-Watson held the Pembroke Visiting Professorship in 2018. He was Executive Fellow at London Business School from 2012 to 2017 and Visiting Professor of Strategic Management at Cranfield University School of Management from 1990 to 1996.

Publications
 Davis, Stephen; Lukomnik, Jon; Pitt-Watson, David (2006). The New Capitalists: How Citizen Investors are Reshaping the Corporate Agenda. Boston: Harvard Business School Press.

References

External links
 Personal website
 

Academics of the University of Cambridge
Living people
Scottish non-fiction writers
Scottish philanthropists
Writers from London
People from Aberdeen
3i Group people
Stanford Graduate School of Business alumni
Labour Party (UK) officials
Labour Party (UK) councillors
Councillors in the City of Westminster
Year of birth missing (living people)